San Diego Jewish Academy (SDJA) is an independent Jewish day school currently located in the Carmel Valley community of San Diego, California. The school is composed of three schools: SDJA Early Childhood Center, Golda Meir Lower School for grades K-5, and Maimonides Upper School for grades 6–12. SDJA is also home to Camp Carmel Creek, a K-5 summer camp that is open to the entire community. 

As a pluralistic Jewish day school, SDJA is not affiliated with any one synagogue or movement of Judaism. SDJA is a pluralistic school and has "compacts" with a number of San Diego synagogues.

History 
SDJA began as a small neighborhood school in rented facilities on the property of Congregation Tifereth Israel in 1979.

In 1999, San Diego Jewish Academy built a 40-acre campus in Carmel Valley. The school is still located on this property, which has since been named the Jaffe Campus following a $7 million donation by the Jaffe family. As of 2013, SDJA is a 56-acre campus.

Football
In 2009, the San Diego Jewish Academy Lions were the first ever Jewish football teams in the United States. The team is made up of 11 players who have taken 25th place in their league and made an appearance in the CIF playoffs. In 2018, the Lions made it to the Finals of the CIF championship. In 2021 SDJA’s Lions won both league and CIF division championships.

Notable alumni
 Ari Seth Cohen, photographer and fashion blogger
 Drew Ferris (born 1992), football player for the Tampa Bay Buccaneers of the National Football League
 David Schipper (born 1991), soccer player for Southland United of the New Zealand Football Championship
Jacob Frank (born 1988), National Football League's Management Council

References 

Jewish day schools in California
Jews and Judaism in San Diego
High schools in San Diego
Pluralistic Jewish day schools
Private elementary schools in California
Private middle schools in California
Private high schools in California
Educational institutions established in 1979
1979 establishments in California